Lobiger sagamiensis is a species of small sea snail, a marine gastropod mollusk in the family Oxynoidae.

The type locality for this species is Sagami Bay, Japan.

References

Oxynoidae
Gastropods described in 1952